Tombe rupestri di San Liberatore (Italian for Rock-cut tombs of Saint Liberator) is a burial place located in Serramonacesca, Province of Pescara (Abruzzo, Italy).

History 

The tombs are speculated to be from the 9th century due to being near the San Liberatore church but no known documentation survives.

Architecture

References

External links
 

Hermitages in Abruzzo
Serramonacesca